Gardener's Supply Company is an employee-owned company providing environmentally friendly gardening products and information through its website, catalogs, and retail stores.

The Gardener’s Supply Company headquarters in Burlington, Vermont include administrative offices, a retail store and display gardens. Additional retail stores and display gardens are located in Williston, Vermont, Lebanon, New Hampshire and Hadley, Massachusetts.

In 2014, Gardener's Supply Company became B Corp-certified.

Employee Stock Ownership Plan
In December 2009, founder Will Raap sold the majority ownership of Gardener’s Supply Company to its employees, officially making the company 100% employee-owned through its Employee Stock Ownership Plan (ESOP). The ESOP was adopted in 1987 to allow all employees to earn stock and share in company profits. Current CEO Jim Feinson said the employee-owned company has also developed "a community culture of support" that offers benefits and flexibility to its employees, including encouraging them to make their own schedules.

Founder, Will Raap
In 1983, his interest in food systems led gardener and businessman Will Raap to co-found Gardener's Supply with co-founder Alan Newman(1)He moved his company to five acres at the entrance to the Intervale, 350 acres of neglected land located in Burlington, Vermont, in 1985. Raap also helped found the non-profit Intervale Center in 1988. As of 2014 it is home to several sustainable businesses in addition to Gardener's Supply Company, including food and flower farms, a café and a market.
1. >
2.

Community Involvement and Support
Gardener's Supply Company donates 8% of pre-tax profits to gardening-related community programs and organizations. Organizations supported by Gardener’s Supply include the American Community Gardening Association (ACGA), the Green Education Foundation (GEF) and AmpleHarvest.org.

The company established the Garden Crusader Awards to honor individuals who improve their communities through gardening.

Gardener's Supply Company is a Champion Member of Vermont Businesses for Social Responsibility (VBSR), a non-profit trade organization that advances business ethics through education, public influence and workplace quality.

References

External links
 
 Green Education Foundation
 

Companies based in Burlington, Vermont
Employee-owned companies of the United States
B Lab-certified corporations